Barboși may refer to the following places in Romania:

Barboși, a tributary of the river Elan in Vaslui County
Barboși, a village in the commune Hoceni, Vaslui County
Bărboși, a village in the commune Zau de Câmpie, Mureș County
Barboși, a neighborhood of the city Galați
Castra of Tirighina-Bărboși, an ancient Roman fort in present Galați County